Magnus Elkjær Mattsson (born 25 February 1999) is a Danish professional footballer who plays as an attacking midfielder for Dutch club NEC Nijmegen.

Club career

Silkeborg
Mattsson started his career at ØBG Fodbold in Silkeborg. He played there until 2012 where he moved to Silkeborg IF at the age of 13 years. He made his debut for Silkeborg IF's first team in the Danish Superliga on 25 August 2017 against Hobro IK. He was also a starter in the cup final in the 2017–18 Danish Cup, where Mattsson and Silkeborg were up against Brøndby IF. The match ended with a 3–1 win for Brøndby IF. At the end of 2018, Mattsson was named player of the year in Silkeborg IF. A few months later, Silkeborg was relegated to the Danish 1st Division.

In March 2019, Mattsson suffered a long-term injury in his groin, which kept him on the sidelines for half a year. However, with 20 appearances and 6 goals in the league during the season, Mattsson helped Silkeborg with promotion to the Danish Superliga again for the 2019–20 season. To gain some game fitness after being injured for half a year, Mattsson was called up for a U19 game in September 2019. Unluckily, Mattsson suffered an injury to his left anterior cruciate ligament in that game and was again out for a longer period. Having undergone knee surgery, he was in recovery until the end of the 2019–20 season.

NEC
On 28 June 2021 it was confirmed, that Mattsson had been sold to Dutch club NEC, signing a deal until June 2024 with an option for one further year.

Personal life
Magnus' younger brother, Pelle Mattsson, is also a footballer, playing for Silkeborg IF. Their father, Joakim Mattsson, is a Swedish football manager.

Beside football, Magnus is also a music producer and creates beats for American musicians.

Honours
Silkeborg
 Danish 1st Division: 2019–20

References

External links
 Magnus Mattsson at Silkeborg IF 
 
 

1999 births
Living people
People from Ærø Municipality
Danish people of Swedish descent
Sportspeople from the Region of Southern Denmark
Danish men's footballers
Association football midfielders
Denmark youth international footballers
Denmark under-21 international footballers
Danish Superliga players
Danish 1st Division players
Eredivisie players
Silkeborg IF players
NEC Nijmegen players
Danish expatriate men's footballers
Danish expatriate sportspeople in the Netherlands
Expatriate footballers in the Netherlands